Kirbu may refer to several places in Estonia:
Kirbu, Valga County, village in Estonia
Kirbu, Võru County, village in Estonia